The 22nd Dallas–Fort Worth Film Critics Association Awards honoring the best in film for 2016 were announced on December 13, 2016. These awards "recognizing extraordinary accomplishment in film" are presented annually by the Dallas–Fort Worth Film Critics Association (DFWFCA), based in the Dallas–Fort Worth metroplex region of Texas. The organization, founded in 1990, includes 30 film critics for print, radio, television, and internet publications based in north Texas. The Dallas–Fort Worth Film Critics Association began presenting its annual awards list in 1993.

Moonlight was the DFWFCA's most awarded film of 2016, taking four top honors: Best Picture, Best Director (Barry Jenkins), Best Supporting Actor (Mahershala Ali), and the Russell Smith Award. La La Land and Manchester by the Sea both won two awards. Manchester by the Sea won Best Actor (Casey Affleck) and Best Screenplay (Kenneth Lonergan), while La La Land won Best Cinematography (Linus Sandgren) and Best Musical Score (Justin Hurwitz).

Winners
Winners are listed first and highlighted with boldface. Other films ranked by the annual poll are listed in order. While most categories saw 5 honorees named, categories ranged from as many as 10 (Best Film) to as few as 2 (Best Cinematography, Best Screenplay, and Best Musical Score).

Category awards

Individual awards

Russell Smith Award
 Moonlight, for "best low-budget or cutting-edge independent film"

References

2016
2016 film awards